Paraiya is a block in Gaya district of Bihar state, India. The Paraiya Block headquarters is Paraiya Khurd town, part of the Magadh division. It is located 17 km west of the district headquarters in Gaya, and 109 km north of the state capital Patna.
Paraiya block is bounded by Guraru block to the west, Konch block to the east, and Tekari Block to the north. Bodh Gaya, Rafiganj, and Sherghati are nearby cities. Paraiya consists of 151 villages and 9 panchayats. Malahi Chak is the smallest village; Solara, the largest. 

Baigoman is one of the zamindari village in Paraiya granted by Tekari Raj to Shri Kashinath Singh of Saran, who helped Tekari Raj to solve the issue of southern dam and provided water to the estate. Bodh Gaya, Chatra, Kakolat, Bihar Sharif, and Koderma are nearby tourist destinations.

Geography

Paraiya is situated between the two rainy rivers Morhar and Sorhar. Paraiya situated at the highest and oldest alluvial plain, made up of the sediments brought from the erosion of the hills and always lies above the flood level of the present day river.

and always lies above the flood level of the present day river because it is the

Demographics of Paraiya Block 
Magahi is the local language, with Hindi, Urdu, and English also spoken. The total population of Paraiya Block is 83,800 living in 12,749 houses. Males number 43,217 and females 40,583.

Schools and Colleges

 Upendarnath Inter College
 Swami Dharnidhar College
 Ashok +2 High School
 Paraiya High school, Paraiya, Gaya
 Primary School, Baigoman

Notable People 
 Shri Rajpati Singh
 Shri Raghunath Singh
 Vinay Kumar

References 

Community development blocks in Gaya district